The Fever  is a 2005 Italian comedy-drama film directed by Alessandro D'Alatri.

Cast 

Fabio Volo: Mario
Valeria Solarino: Linda
Alessandro Garbin: Giovanni
Cochi Ponzoni: Mario
Arnoldo Foà: The President 
Gisella Burinato: Maddalena 
Lucilla Agosti: Marina
Julie Depardieu: Julie
Stefano Chiodaroli: Michele

References

External links

2005 films
Italian comedy-drama films
Films directed by Alessandro D'Alatri
2000s Italian-language films
2000s Italian films